Steven Morrissey (born 25 July 1986) is a Jamaican football player currently playing for VPS.

Career

Club
In the 2012 season, he finished 3rd in the top scorers chart in Veikkausliiga behind Irakli Sirbiladze of Inter and Aleksei Kangaskolkka of IFK Mariehamn. He finished the season with 15 goals in 28 appearances.

Honours 
Jamaica National Premier League: 2
 2007, 2008

References

External links
  Profile at vepsu.fi
  Profile at veikkausliiga.com
  Steven Morrissey skifter til SIF

1986 births
Living people
Jamaican footballers
Vaasan Palloseura players
Veikkausliiga players
Silkeborg IF players
Jamaican expatriate footballers
Expatriate footballers in Finland
Expatriate men's footballers in Denmark
Association football forwards
National Premier League players